Channel Umptee-3 (also known simply as Umptee-3) is a Saturday morning animated television series created by Jim George and produced by Norman Lear. It aired on The WB as part of the Kids' WB programming block from 1997 to 1998. The one-season cartoon was designed to teach children to appreciate the wonders of everyday things, such as sleep and water. The title is derived from the fictitonal number "umpteen". It was also the last television series that Lear was involved in as an executive producer until the 2017 revival of One Day at a Time.

Format
Ogden Ostrich, Holey Moley (a mole), and Sheldon S. Cargo (a snail) drive around the world in a van with their own underground pirate television station. Channel Umptee-3, which exists between other channels and is broadcast from a mobile station, tries to focus on a specific topic in each episode, but is normally diverted from it and shifted onto another topic; e.g., one episode started out discussing cats, but quickly segued into the subject of ownership (which was the real topic of that show). Meanwhile, "The Frumps" (i.e., Stickley Rickets and his henchmen) would try to shut the station down or increase their own power, but whatever plan they came up with would fail.

The show made great use of stock footage, as did the earlier WB show Freakazoid! Also, the show sometimes made references to well-known films and TV shows; e.g., the episode "Yours, Mine, and Ours" included references to Cats, Harvey, Star Wars, Dragnet, and The People's Court, and the title was that of a classic film.

Characters

The Umptees
 Ogden O. Ostrich (Rob Paulsen) – An excitable yellow ostrich who first came up with the idea for a television program to show everyone that "the world is a magical place" after pulling his head out of the ground one day and looking at the world around him. At the start of every episode, Ogden comes running up the camera yelling "Hey!" over and over.
 Holey Moley – A pantomime character. He is a large mole who carries a number of portable holes that allow him and his friends to go anywhere.
 Sheldon S. Cargo (David Paymer) – A large pink snail whose shell is fitted with a unicycle-like wheel to help him get around. Sheldon is the serious, professional member of the team; he tries his best to hold the show together, despite Ogden's almost hyperactive behavior. His name is derived from the French word "escargot".
 Professor Edwin I. Relevant (Greg Burson) – The station's resident expert on everything. Ogden and the others turn to Professor Relevant for information on the day's topic in almost every episode.
 Test and Polly (Neil Ross and Susan Silo) – two newscasters who work for Channel Umptee-3.

The Frumps
 Stickley Rickets (voiced by Jonathan Harris) – The elderly president of a corporation that produces boxes. Because the "Umptee-doodies" (as he calls them) encourage people to take things out of boxes and look at them in a new way, he sees them as a threat to his business. So he constantly plots to shut them down and "put them in a box, where they belong."
 Pandora Rickets (voiced by Alice Ghostley) – Stickley's wife. She isn't nearly as obsessed as her husband where the Umptees are concerned. Pandora even likes to watch some of the shows, although she does not want Stickley to find out. Her name is derived from "Pandora's box".
 Ed and Bud (voiced by Neil Ross and Gregg Berger) – Two black-suited henchmen who carry out Stickley's orders and are almost never successful. Ed is the taller one, and Bud is the shorter, balding one.

Other voices
Other voice actors who appeared on the show included:

 Charlie Adler 
 Susanne Blakeslee
 Jeff Bennett
 Liz Georges
 Jason Graae
 Maurice LaMarche 
 Pat Musick
 Julie Payne
 Patrick Pinney 
 Roger Rose
 Tara Charendoff 
 Laura Summer
 Ron Taylor
 Frank Welker

Crew
 Mark Evanier – Voice Director

Episodes

Episode status
Due to the short run and general obscurity of Channel Umptee-3, only four episodes and the intro music have been found publicly after its initial airing. Originally, the second, third, tenth and twelfth episodes were posted to YouTube, but they were blocked worldwide by Sony Pictures, leading them to be posted elsewhere, ultimately on the Internet Archive.

Currently, Sony Pictures Television has the full rights to Channel Umptee-3, and has the option to provide the series for streaming content providers. , it is not yet available on any streaming platform, although it was rumored at one point to be potentially available on streaming platform Crackle sometime in late 2022/early 2023.

References

External links

Official Website (via Internet Archive)
Big Cartoon DataBase: Channel Umptee-3 index
Toonarific Cartoons: Channel Umptee-3

1990s American animated television series
1997 American television series debuts
1998 American television series endings
American children's animated comedy television series
Fictional television stations
The WB original programming
Kids' WB original shows
Television series about television
Television series by Adelaide Productions
Television series by Sony Pictures Television